Joseph Furphy (Irish: Seosamh Ó Foirbhithe; 26 September 1843 – 13 September 1912) was an Australian author and poet who is widely regarded as the "Father of the Australian novel". He mostly wrote under the pseudonym Tom Collins and is best known for his novel Such Is Life (1903), regarded as an Australian classic.

Personal life
Furphy was born at Yering Station in Yering, Victoria. Samuel Furphy was head gardener on the station. There was no school in the district and at first Joseph was educated by his mother. The only books available were the Bible and Shakespeare and at seven years of age Furphy was already learning passages of each by heart; he never forgot them. In about 1850 the family moved to Kangaroo Ground, Victoria, and here the parents of the district built a school and obtained a master. In 1852 they moved again, to Kyneton where Samuel Furphy began business as a hay and corn merchant. A few years later he leased a farm and also bought a threshing plant. This was worked by Joseph and a brother and both became competent engine-drivers. In 1864 Furphy bought a threshing outfit and travelled the Daylesford and surrounding districts. At Glenlyon he met Leonie Selina Germain, a girl of 16 of French extraction, and in  they were married.

Soon after, his wife's mother went to New Zealand and Furphy for a time carried on her farm, but two years later took up a selection near Colbinabbin. The land proved to be poor and in about 1873 he sold out and soon afterwards bought a team of bullocks. He became prosperous as the years went by, but the drought came and he had heavy losses. Some of his bullocks and horses died from pleuro-pneumonia, and in 1884 he accepted a position in the foundry of his brother John at Shepparton. There he worked for some 20 years doing much reading and writing in the evenings.

Late in his life, Furphy moved to Western Australia to join his sons who had established an iron foundry there. He built a house at Swanbourne. Furphy died in Claremont on 13 September 1912 and is buried in Karrakatta Cemetery.

Literary career

In his youth Furphy had written many verses and in December 1867 he had been awarded the first prize of £3 at the Kyneton Literary Society for a vigorous set of verses on 'The Death of President Lincoln'. While living at Shepparton, he was encouraged in his writing by Kate Baker, a schoolteacher who boarded with his mother. He sent a story 'The Mythical Sundowner' to The Bulletin under the name 'Warrigal Jack' and it was accepted for publication. Later works were published under the pseudonym 'Tom Collins' which may have come from the slang term meaning "a fellow about town whom many sought to kill for touching them on 'sore points'".

His most famous work is Such Is Life, a fictional account of the life of rural dwellers, including bullock drivers, squatters and itinerant travellers, in southern New South Wales and Victoria, during the 1880s. In 1897 the manuscript was sent to The Bulletin where A. G. Stephens recognised its worth, but also that it was not a commercial proposition. He suggested cuts including the replacement of two entire chapters. Stephens persuaded the proprietors of The Bulletin to publish the revised Such Is Life because it was a great Australian work although not commercially viable. It was published in 1903 under his pseudonym 'Tom Collins' and only sold about a third of the print run. Later editions were brought out after Furphy's death through the efforts of Kate Baker who bought the residual copies from The Bulletin. 

Having removed the original chapters 2 and 5 from Such is Life, Furphy considered joining these portions together as the basis for another novel but instead decided to focus on chapter 5 separately. He expanded and remodeled the chapter to form Rigby's Romance, which was serialised in The Barrier Truth from 27 October 1905 to 20 July 1906. It would be released in book form in 1921. After moving to Western Australia in 1905, Furphy commenced work on revising the original second chapter, which he titled The Lyre Bird and the Native Companion before retitling it The Buln-Buln and the Brolga. Never published in his lifetime, the manuscript was provided by Furphy's son Samuel and ultimately published in book form in 1946. Both of these subsequent novels feature the same protagonist, Tom Collins, and function as adjuncts to the first novel.

Legacy

Such is Life has been described as Australia's Moby Dick because, like Melville's book, it was neglected for thirty or forty years before being discovered as a classic. The novel contains possibly the first written incidence of the Australian and New Zealand idiom "ropeable". Chapter One contains the following phrase: "On't ole Martin be ropeable when he sees that fence!" The historian Stuart MacIntyre has said the book challenged the assumption that "nothing of significance ever happened" in Australia or that Australians lacked "creative originality".

A full biography of Furphy was written through a collaboration of Australian author Miles Franklin and Furphy's friend Kate Baker, titled Joseph Furphy: The Legend of a Man and His Book, in 1944.

To honour Furphy, in 1992 his and his brother's descendants established the Furphy Literary award. On the 100th anniversary of Such is Life they also funded a statue in Furphy's home town. The home which Furphy built in Swanbourne is now the headquarters of the West Australian branch of the Fellowship of Australian Writers.

Furphy's popularity may have influenced the usage of the Australian slang word "furphy", meaning a "tall story". However, scholars consider it more likely that the word originated with water carts, produced in large numbers by J. Furphy & Sons, a company owned by Furphy's brother John.

Works

 Such Is Life (1903)
 
 Rigby's Romance (1921)
 The Buln Buln and the Brolga (1946)
Various articles in periodicals (List)
 Christmas Hymn to music composed by Australian composer Arthur Chanter

References

Further reading 
 A. L. Archer, Tom Collins (Joseph Furphy) as I Knew Him (Melb, 1941)

Bushman and Bookworm: Letters of Joseph Furphy  edited by John Barnes and Lois Hoffmann; Melbourne: Oxford University Press 1995

  — this is the first article published in The Bulletin by Furphy, under the pseudonym "Warrigal Jack"
Furphy papers (State Library of New South Wales).
Julian Croft The Life and Opinions of Tom Collins: A Study of the Works of Joseph Furphy St Lucia, Queensland: University of Queensland Press 1991

The annotated Such Is Life: being certain extracts from the diary of Tom Collins / by Joseph Furphy ; with an introduction and notes by Frances Devlin-Glass, Robin Eaden, Lois Hoffmann and G.W.Turner; Melbourne: Oxford University Press 1991

External links 
 The official Joseph Furphy website
 
 
 
 
 rootsweb.com "Collins Family History" 
 Susan Martin '"us circling round and round": The Track of narrative and the ghosts of lost children in Such is Life ' JASAL Special Issue 2007
The Furphy Literary Award site

1843 births
1912 deaths
Burials at Karrakatta Cemetery
Writers from Perth, Western Australia
People from Victoria (Australia)
Australian male short story writers
Australian people of Irish descent
Australian people of Scottish descent
People from the Riverina
20th-century Australian novelists
Australian Christian socialists
20th-century Australian short story writers
20th-century Australian male writers
Australian male novelists
20th-century pseudonymous writers